Brichebor Peak is the peak rising to 2900 m in Vinson Massif, Sentinel Range in Ellsworth Mountains, Antarctica, situated at the end of a side ridge descending southwestwards from Príncipe de Asturias Peak (4680 m).  It surmounts Tulaczyk Glacier to the southeast and Cairns Glacier to the northwest.

The peak is named after Brichebor Peak in Rila Mountain, Southwestern Bulgaria.

Location
US mapping in 1961, 1988 and 2007.

See also
 Mountains in Antarctica

Maps
 Vinson Massif.  Scale 1:250 000 topographic map.  Reston, Virginia: US Geological Survey, 1988.
 D. Gildea and C. Rada.  Vinson Massif and the Sentinel Range.  Scale 1:50 000 topographic map.  Omega Foundation, 2007.
 Antarctic Digital Database (ADD). Scale 1:250000 topographic map of Antarctica. Scientific Committee on Antarctic Research (SCAR). Since 1993, regularly updated.

References
 Bulgarian Antarctic Gazetteer. Antarctic Place-names Commission. (details in Bulgarian, basic data in English)
 Brichebor Peak. SCAR Composite Gazetteer of Antarctica

External links
 Brichebor Peak. Copernix satellite image

Bulgaria and the Antarctic
Ellsworth Mountains
Mountains of Ellsworth Land